Brendon David Little (born August 11, 1996) is an American professional baseball pitcher in the Chicago Cubs organization.

Amateur career
Little graduated from Conestoga High School in 2015. He was drafted by the San Francisco Giants in the 36th round of the 2015 MLB draft, but he chose not to sign and instead decided to enroll at the University of North Carolina to play college baseball. After appearing in only four games as a freshman in 2016, he transferred to the State College of Florida, Manatee–Sarasota. In 2016, he played collegiate summer baseball with the Bourne Braves of the Cape Cod Baseball League, and was named a league all-star. In 2017, his sophomore year, he went 5–3 with a 2.53 ERA in 15 starts.

Professional career
After his sophomore season, Little was drafted by the Chicago Cubs in the first round of the 2017 MLB draft. He signed, and was assigned to the Eugene Emeralds, where he went 0–2 with a 9.37 ERA in six starts.

Little spent the 2018 season with the South Bend Cubs, compiling a 5–11 record with 5.15 ERA in 22 games (21 starts). Little began 2019 with the Myrtle Beach Pelicans on the injured list. After being activated from the IL, he returned to South Bend before being promoted back to Myrtle Beach. Over six starts with South Bend, he compiled a 1.91 ERA, and over four starts with the Pelicans, he went 2–1 with a 5.95 ERA.

Little did not play a minor league game in 2020 due to the cancellation of the minor league season caused by the COVID-19 pandemic. In 2021, he saw action as a reliever, pitching with the Tennessee Smokies and Iowa Cubs for the majority of the season. He found relative success in this new role, accruing a 3.24 ERA across 26 games with 53 strikeouts.

On August 30, 2022, the Cubs selected Little's contract and promoted him to the major leagues. He made his MLB debut that day, pitching against the Toronto Blue Jays. On September 1, 2022, Little was returned back to Triple-A Iowa.

References

External links

1996 births
Living people
Arizona League Cubs players
Baseball players from Pennsylvania
Bourne Braves players
Chicago Cubs players
Eugene Emeralds players
Iowa Cubs players
Major League Baseball pitchers
Mesa Solar Sox players
Myrtle Beach Pelicans players
North Carolina Tar Heels baseball players
People from Bryn Mawr, Pennsylvania
SCF Manatees baseball players
South Bend Cubs players
Tennessee Smokies players